

Geographical distribution
As of 2014, 56.8% of all known bearers of the surname Deb were residents of India and 40.3% were residents of Bangladesh. In India, the frequency of the surname was higher than national average in the following states:

 1. Tripura (1: 46)
 2. Meghalaya (1: 700)
 3. Assam (1: 961)
 4. Arunachal Pradesh (1: 1,026)
 5. Nagaland (1: 1,497)
 6. West Bengal (1: 2,528)

Notable people

Gajapati Maharaja Dibyasingha Deb (born 1953), King of Puri, "Aadyasevak" (treated as the first and foremost servitor) of Lord Jagannath.
Amiya Deb (1917–1983), Indian sportsman
Ashutosh Deb (1803–1856), Indian musician and writer
Debbie Deb (born 1966), American singer
Gautam Deb (born 1954), Indian politician
Goutam Deb (born 1959), Indian politician 
Joy Deb (born 1979), Swedish songwriter
Kalyanmoy Deb (born 1964), Indian computer scientist
Linnea Deb (born 1977), Swedish actress
Prachi Dhabal Deb (born 1986), Indian artist
Radhakanta Deb (1784–1867), Indian scholar 
Raja Narayan Deb, Indian composer
Samar Deb (born 1963), Indian writer 
Siddhartha Deb (born 1970), Indian author 
Tathoi Deb (born 1996), Indian actress
Trisha Deb (born 1991), Indian archer
Dasarath Deb (born 1916), former Chief Minister of Tripura
Manoj Kanti Deb (born 1972), Minister in Biplab Kumar Deb ministry
Biplab Kumar Deb (born 1971), Tripura CM first (BJP chief minister of Tripura)

References

See also
Deb (disambiguation)
Deb (given name)
Debs (disambiguation)

Indian surnames